Manuel "Manu" Garrido Álvarez (born 6 October 2000) is a Spanish footballer who plays as a forward for Celta de Vigo B, on loan from CD Leganés.

Club career
Born in Madrid, Garrido joined CD Leganés' youth setup in 2013 at the age of 12. On 27 August 2017, aged just 16, he made his senior debut with the reserves by coming on as a late substitute for Álex Mozo in a 3–2 Tercera División away win against AD Alcorcón B.

Garrido scored his first senior goal on 31 March 2019, netting his team's second in a 3–0 away defeat of AD Parla. Despite being sparingly used for the B's since 2017, he only finished his formation in 2019, being definitely promoted to the reserve team in July of the latter year.

Garrido made his first team – and La Liga – debut on 27 June 2020, replacing Roque Mesa late into a 1–2 loss at CA Osasuna. On 28 September, he renewed his contract until 2024 and was immediately loaned to Segunda División B side Hércules CF for the season.

On 30 August 2021, Garrido moved to Primera División RFEF side UCAM Murcia CF on loan for one year. Upon returning, he was assigned to the main squad, but left the club again in a temporary deal on 11 January 2023, to Celta de Vigo B; he also renewed his contract with Lega until 2025 prior to the move.

References

External links
 Leganés profile 
 
 
 

2000 births
Living people
Footballers from Madrid
Spanish footballers
Association football forwards
La Liga players
Segunda División players
Primera Federación players
Segunda División B players
Tercera División players
CD Leganés B players
CD Leganés players
Hércules CF players
UCAM Murcia CF players
Celta de Vigo B players